Rotinoff may refer to:

Alexander Rotinoff (1875-1934), Russian architect
Rotinoff Motors, British commercial vehicle manufacturer
Rotinoff Super Atlantic, ballast tractor made by Rotinoff Motors